Justo Noguera Pietri (born 15 March 1961) is a Venezuelan politician who served as the Governor of Bolívar. He was appointed as State Governor by the National Electoral Council and served from October 2017 to November 2021.

Early life and education 
Justo José Noguera Pietri was born on 15 March 1961, in Portuguesa. He graduated from the Officer Training School of the National Guard in 1984.

References 

1961 births
21st-century Venezuelan politicians
Living people
Governors of Bolívar (state)